Sunset Rollercoaster ( Luòrì fēichē) is a 5-piece jazz-influenced synth-pop band from Taipei, Taiwan consisting of Kuo-Hung Tseng (vocals, guitar), Hung-Li Chen (bass), Shao-Hsuan Wang (keyboard), Tsun-Lung Lo (drums), Hao-Ting Huang (saxophone), and former member Shih-Wei Huang (percussion). The name originated from a Photo Booth picture the group had taken for their MySpace profile in the 2009, which had a rollercoaster in front of a sunset as the background. The band mostly sings in English, despite being based in a Mandarin-speaking country, which, according to lead singer Kuo Kuo, is to allow them to speak indirectly and allow audiences to discern their own meaning.

History 

The idea for the band was inspired by Velvet Underground videos that lead singer Kuo found on the internet. The band formed in 2009 as a trio composed of Tseng Kuo Hung, Kevin Lee and Lo Zun Long, released their debut album Bossa Nova in 2011, but then disbanded shortly afterward. Singer Kuo Kuo and drummer Lo Tsun formed another band, Forests, which had a different, much darker sound. Sunset Rollercoaster re-formed in 2015 and released their second album Cassa Nova in 2018. In 2019, the band released the EP Vanilla Villa, which revolves around the story of an alien who loves a human who it wants to take to a villa.

The band played at the Summer Sonic music festival in Japan in 2011. After their hiatus, they performed at SummerStage in Central Park, New York City, as part of the Taiwanese Waves music festival in 2017. They recorded a live studio session at Audiotree in 2018, the first Taiwanese band to do so. The band toured North America as part of the "Business Trip Tour" in 2018.

In early 2020 Kuo-Hung Tseng wrote in Los Angeles lyrics for Soft Storm and recorded in part with Ned Doheny. Their 2020 album Soft Storm was named the 4th best album in Asia in 2020 by NME.

They composed 3 songs featured in the anime Sonny Boy.

Discography

Studio albums 

 Bossa Nova (2011)
 Cassa Nova (2018)
 Soft Storm (2020)

Extended play 

 Jinji Kikko (2016)
 Vanilla Villa (2019)

Singles 

 Villa (Jerry Paper Remix) (2019)
 我是一隻魚 I’m a fish (cover, 2019)
 Candlelight (feat. Oh Hyuk, 2020)
 小薇 (cover, 2021)
 忘情水 (cover, 2021)
 Coffee's on Me (2021)
 Let There Be Light Again (2021)
 滾石40 滾石撞樂隊 40團拚經典 - 愛錯 (cover, 2021)
 金牛座的牢騷 (cover, 2022)
 Little Balcony (2022)
 ''Jellyfish (feat. Michael Seyer, 2022)

Awards

References

External links 
Official site
Bandcamp page
Facebook
YouTube channel
Instagram page

Taiwanese rock music groups